The election for the President of the Seventh Legislative Council took place on 10 January 2022 for members of the 7th Legislative Council of Hong Kong to among themselves elect the President of the Legislative Council of Hong Kong for the duration of the Council.

Procedures
Schedule 1 of the Rules of Procedure of the Legislative Council stipulates the procedures of the election for president. The Clerk to the Legislative Council will prepare a list of all the nominations in the order of receipt and distribute to all members at least 2 clear days before the day of the election. Before the election, candidates will be able to present their manifesto and answer questions in a special forum.

The secretariat announced that the deadline for nomination is on 4 January 2022 while the election will take place on 10 January. As only one nomination was received at deadline, Andrew Leung was declared duly elected.

Candidates
According to Article 71 of the Hong Kong Basic Law and Rule 4 of the Rules of Procedure of the Legislative Council, the President of the Legislative Council has to be a Chinese citizen of 40 years old or above, a permanent resident of Hong Kong with no right of abode in any foreign country, and has ordinarily resided in Hong Kong for not less than 20 years continuously.

Valid nomination

Results

References 

Legislative Council of Hong Kong
2021 Hong Kong legislative election
2022 elections in China
2022 in Hong Kong
Uncontested elections
President of the Hong Kong Legislative Council elections